Antigonish Arena is a 2,290-seat multi-purpose arena in Antigonish, Nova Scotia, Canada. It is home to the Junior B Antigonish Bulldogs hockey team. The arena was home to the St. Francis Xavier X-Men and X-Women hockey teams before they moved into a new on-campus arena.

External links
 Official website
 https://web.archive.org/web/20080517162518/http://www.freewebs.com/mjahl/antigonish.htm

Indoor arenas in Nova Scotia
Indoor ice hockey venues in Canada
Sports venues in Nova Scotia
Antigonish, Nova Scotia